Gavin Louis Escobar (February 3, 1991 – September 28, 2022) was an American football tight end who played for five seasons in the National Football League (NFL) and a season in the Alliance of American Football (AAF). He played for the Dallas Cowboys and Baltimore Ravens from 2013 to 2017, after having played college football for the San Diego State Aztecs.

Early life
Escobar was born in New York City on February 3, 1991 to Erin and Harry Escobar. He had two siblings; his brother Declan Escobar and his sister Morgan Escobar. After moving to California in the early 2000's, he attended Santa Margarita Catholic High School in Rancho Santa Margarita, California, where he played for the school's football and basketball teams. In football, he was a Trinity League second-team selection on offense in 2008 after making 37 receptions for 492 yards and six scores. In a game against St. Bonaventure, the eventual state Division III champion, he had seven receptions for 130 yards. As a junior, he caught 11 passes for 163 yards (14.8 yards per catch). He was regarded as a two-star recruit by Rivals.com. Additionally, Escobar was a standout basketball player and key contributor alongside NBA star Klay Thompson, as Santa Margarita reached the California Division III State Championship in 2008.

College career
Escobar was awarded a football scholarship from San Diego State University, which he accepted. He played for the Aztecs from 2009 to 2012. After his diagnosis with testicular cancer, he was redshirted as a true freshman and was in remission after the tumor was removed. In 2010, he started 12 games, recording 29 receptions for 323 yards and 4 touchdowns. Despite his decreased role the following year (6 starts in 13 games), his production improved and he finished fifth in the Mountain West Conference (MWC) in receptions (51), receiving yards (780), receiving touchdowns (7), and sixth in receiving yards per reception (15.3). During his junior year, he posted 42 receptions for 543 yards and had the fourth-most touchdowns in the conference (6).

During the 2011 and 2012 seasons, Escobar was a first-team All-MWC selection. For his college career, he registered 122 receptions for 1,646 yards, 17 touchdowns and did not miss a game.

Professional career

Dallas Cowboys

2013
Escobar was drafted by the Dallas Cowboys in the second round (47th overall) of the 2013 NFL Draft. He made his NFL debut with the Cowboys on September 8, 2013, at the age of 22, in a 36–31 win against the New York Giants. During his rookie season, he was expected to be a pass catching option in the two tight end packages, but he was used sparingly, registering 9 receptions for 134 yards and 2 touchdowns. He became the fifth rookie tight end in franchise history to catch multiple touchdowns in a season.

2014
Escobar remained in a backup role in his second season in the league, but was passed on the depth chart by James Hanna, who was used to block at the point of attack in the running game. He was mostly used on special teams and as a red zone target, finishing with 105 receiving yards and 4 touchdowns on 9 receptions.

2015
Escobar was unable to increase his role in the team's offense and remained as the third-string tight end, despite wide receiver Dez Bryant missing 7 games. The 12 games that quarterback Tony Romo missed also impacted his production, finishing with 8 receptions for 64 yards and one touchdown.

Escobar suffered a season-ending injury when he tore his right Achilles tendon in the last drive of the fourteenth game of the season against the New York Jets. On December 25, he was placed on the injured reserve list, in order to promote defensive tackle Casey Walker to the 53-man roster.

2016
Escobar made a surprisingly quick recovery from his Achilles injury, allowing him to have a full participation in training camp, though he was passed on the depth chart by Geoff Swaim, who displayed better blocking ability. After being used primarily as a core special teams player and only participating in 29 offensive plays, Escobar became the backup tight end after Swaim suffered a season-ending injury in the week 10 win against the Pittsburgh Steelers. Because he struggled with his blocking, the Cowboys were forced to use offensive lineman Joe Looney as the blocking tight end in short yardage situations. Escobar finished with 4 receptions and one touchdown.

Although Escobar had the size and continued improving his technique, he could never develop into a dependable in-line blocker. As with other Cowboys tight ends during the Jason Witten era, the team's coaches could never find a complementary role for him in the passing game, which limited Escobar to never starting more than 4 games and recording more than 9 receptions in a season. He played in 62 games (7 starts), making 30 receptions for 333 yards and 8 touchdowns.

Kansas City Chiefs
Escobar signed a one-year contract as a free agent with the Kansas City Chiefs on March 31, 2017. However, Escobar was released on September 2 after not being able to pass Ross Travis on the depth chart.

Baltimore Ravens
On October 23, 2017, Escobar signed with the Baltimore Ravens, who were looking to improve their depth after tight end Maxx Williams re-injured his ankle. On November 18, he was released to make room for Danny Woodhead.

Cleveland Browns
Escobar signed a reserve/future contract with the Cleveland Browns on January 15, 2018. He was released by the Browns on April 12, 2018.

Miami Dolphins
Escobar signed with the Miami Dolphins on April 16, 2018. He was released on September 1, 2018, but was re-signed five days later. He was released on September 11, 2018.

San Diego Fleet (AAF)
After getting released by the Dolphins, Escobar joined the San Diego Fleet of the newly-formed Alliance of American Football. He was placed on injured reserve on April 1, 2019. The league ceased operations in April 2019. Escobar caught 14 passes for 142 yards during his time in the AAF.

Personal life and death
Escobar was married and had two children. After retiring from football, he worked as a firefighter for the Long Beach Fire Department in California, starting in February 2022.

Escobar died at around noon on September 28, 2022, while rock climbing near Tahquitz Rock in the San Bernardino National Forest. He was 31 years old. He was climbing with a friend who also died during the climb.

NFL career statistics

References

External links
San Diego Aztecs bio

1991 births
2022 deaths
American football tight ends
Baltimore Ravens players
Cleveland Browns players
Dallas Cowboys players
Kansas City Chiefs players
Miami Dolphins players
Mountaineering deaths
People from Rancho Santa Margarita, California
Players of American football from California
Puerto Rican players of American football
San Diego Fleet players
San Diego State Aztecs football players
Sports deaths in California
Players of American football from New York City
Sportspeople from Orange County, California